Monodendri may refer to:
Monodendri, Ioannina, a village in Zagori, Ioannina regional unit, Greece 
Monodendri, Achaea, part of the municipal unit of Vrachnaiika, Achaea, Greece